Pulling boat hands is a cutaneous condition that results from rowing in cold, wet conditions.

See also 
 Postmiliarial hypohidrosis
 List of cutaneous conditions

References 

Skin conditions resulting from physical factors